The Yugoslav passport was issued to citizens of Yugoslavia for the purpose of international travel. The passport of SFR Yugoslavia has been described as highly regarded and that with it immigrants were able to find jobs among European firms trading with the East and other countries. It was also described as "one of the most convenient in the world, as it was one of the few with which a person could travel freely through both the East and West" during the Cold War.

Under the Yugoslav federal system, each constituent republic had its own register of citizens, and issued a somewhat distinct variety of passports. In particular, Yugoslav passports issued in SR Macedonia were printed in Macedonian and French, rather than in Serbo-Croatian; those issued in Socialist Autonomous Province of Kosovo were in Albanian, Serbo-Croatian, and French.

Past and Future passports

See also

Bosnia and Herzegovina passport
Croatian passport
Kosovo passport
Montenegrin passport
North Macedonian passport
Serbian passport
Slovenian passport

References

Defunct passports
Passport
Passport